The most important lakes in the Faroe Islands are Sørvágsvatn on Vágar, Fjallavatn also on Vágar, Sandsvatn on Sandoy, Lake Eiði on Eysturoy and Lake Toftir on Eysturoy. There are many other smaller lakes across the whole country, most of them used for leisure fishing. Some of the lakes are also used for electricity production, and especially Lake Eiði near Eiði and the water systems around Vestmanna are important in this context. Also in Strond on Borðoy and at Botnur in Suðuroy there are important power-plants.

The 10 largest lakes in the Faroe Islands (natural sizes) 

 1. Sørvágsvatn, Vágar, 3.57 km² (This lake has two names, the other name is Leitisvatn)
 2. Fjallavatn, Vágar, 1.03 km²
 3. Sandsvatn, Sandoy, 0.82 km²
 4. Lake Toftir (Toftavatn), Eysturoy, 0.51 km²
 5. Lake Eiði (Eiðisvatn), Eysturoy, 0.47 km² (0.47 is the natural size of the lake before SEV made a dam there for their hydro-power plant; now the lake is 1.14)
 6. Lake Leynar (Leynavatn), Streymoy, 0.18 km²
 7. Kirkjuvatn, Suðuroy, 0.17 km²
 8. Stóravatn, Sandoy 0.15 km²
 9. Vatnsnes, Suðuroy, 0.15 km²
 10. Gróthúsvatn, Sandoy, 0.14 km²

List of lakes in the Faroe Islands 

Lakes referred to on the islands of Suðuroy, Sandoy, Vágoy, Nólsoy, Eysturoy, Streymoy and Hestur: 
Pollur in Saksun 
Saksunarvatn
Sandsvatn on Sandoy, 0.82 km²
Norðbergsvatn, between Hvalba and Norðbergseiði in Suðuroy
Heygsvatn, between Hvalbiareiði and Hvalba in Suðuroy
Vatnið í Hvannhaga (The Lake in Hvannhagi) in Suðuroy
Vágsvatn in Suðuroy.
Hamravatn
Rættarvatn
Bláfossvatn
Nykarvatn, near Øravík in Suðuroy
Mjáuvøtn
Hviltavatn
Kirkjuvatn near Fámjin in Suðuroy, 0.17 km²
Vatnið við Vágseiði (Lake near Vágseiði)
Tindarlíðarvatn in Suðuroy
Miðvatn in Suðuroy 
Ryskivatn in Suðuroy
Bessavatn
Lakes of Hovsdalur, Suðuroy
Lakes of Hamrahagi
Gróthúsvatn, Sandoy, 0.14 km²
Stóravatn
Lítlavatn 
Norðara Hálsavatn
Heimara Hálsavatn 
Vatndalsvatn
Lómatjørn
Lykkjuvøtn 
Fossavatn 
Múlbergsvatn 
Núpsvatn
Ørguvatn 
Dunjavatn 
Hólmavatn 
Gásdalsvatn on Sandoy
Stóratjørn 
Sørvágsvatn (also called Leitisvatn) in Vágar, 3.57 km²
Fjallavatn in Vágar, 1.03 km²
Hviltkinnavatn 
Breiðavatn
Álkuðarvatn 
Halavatn
Reyðastígavatn 
Steinavatn
Lake Toftir, Eysturoy, 0.51 km²
Lake Eiði, Eysturoy, 0.47 km²
Mølinvatn 
Kornvatn 
Starvatn 
Vørðuvatn 
Kvíandalsvatn, Eysturoy
Trælavatn, Eysturoy
Heiðavatn 
Lake Leynar in Streymoy, 0,18 km²
Saksunarvatn in Streymoy
Pollur í Saksun 
Mýrarnar
Mjáuvøtn 
Vatnið
Stóravatn 
Gásafjallavatn 
Brúnavatn
Gásavatn in Streymoy
Áarstíggjavatn 
Porkerisvatn in Streymoy
Fagradalsvatn in Hestur
Hálsvatn in Hestur

See also

Further reading

 AMSINCK, SUSANNE LILDAL, AGNIESZKA STRZELCZAK, RIKKE BJERRING, FRANK LANDKILDEHUS, TORBEN L. LAURIDSEN, KIRSTEN CHRISTOFFERSEN, and ERIK JEPPESEN. 2006. "APPLIED ISSUES: Lake Depth Rather Than Fish Planktivory Determines Cladoceran Community Structure in Faroese Lakes - Evidence from Contemporary Data and Sediments". Freshwater Biology. 51, no. 11: 2124-2142. 
 Five Faroese Lakes Physico-Chemical and Biological Aspects. Annales Societatis Scientiarum Faeroensis, 36. Tórshavn, Faroe Islands: Føroya fróðskaparfelag, 2002. 
 P̐ưALSSON, CARINA, EMMA S. KRITZBERG, KIRSTEN CHRISTOFFERSEN, and WILHELM GRAN̐ưELI. 2005. "Net Heterotrophy in Faroe Islands Clear-Water Lakes: Causes and Consequences for Bacterioplankton and Phytoplankton". Freshwater Biology. 50, no. 12: 2011-2020.

References

Faroe Islands
Lakes